Dildo Run Provincial Park is a provincial park located on New World Island, Newfoundland and Labrador, Canada. It was opened to the public in 1967. The nearest major town is Twillingate. There are 55 campsites, each with a picnic table, fireplace, garbage can, and room for a vehicle. Fifteen picnic sites offer a view of the ocean. There is also a 1.3 km hiking trail through the forest.

See also
List of protected areas of Newfoundland and Labrador
List of Canadian provincial parks
List of National Parks of Canada

References

External links
Dildo Run Park - Newfoundland and Labrador Provincial Parks

Provincial parks of Newfoundland and Labrador